The Princeton Tigers represented Princeton University in ECAC women's ice hockey during the 2014–15 NCAA Division I women's ice hockey season. The Tigers were stopped by nationally ranked Quinnipiac in the ECAC quarterfinals.

Offseason

September 22: Goaltender Kimberly Newell and Assistant Coach Cara Morey were invited by Team Canada to participate in the Fall Festival in Calgary, Alberta.

Recruiting

2014–15 Tigers

Schedule

|-
!colspan=12 style="  style="background:black;color:#F77F00;"| Regular Season

|-
!colspan=12 style="  style="background:black;color:#F77F00;"| ECAC Tournament

Awards and honors
Molly Contini, Forward, All-ECAC Second Team
Kelsey Koelzer, Defense, All-ECAC Second Team

References

Princeton
Princeton Tigers women's ice hockey seasons
Princeton Tigers
Princeton Tigers